Eois camptographata is a moth in the family Geometridae. It is found in Peru.

References

Moths described in 1922
Eois
Moths of South America